Ingemar Ståhl (June 2, 1938 – February 6, 2014) was a Swedish economist and an economics professor from Lund University.

Life
Ståhl was born on June 2, 1938, in Stockholm, Sweden.

He graduated, with a bachelor degree, in 1958 in the University of Stockholm. He earned his Licentiate of Philosophy in 1965 at the Lund University.

Ståhl was married to Solveig Ståhl, whom he had three children: Nils Ståhl, Pernilla Ståhl, and Ingela Ståhl. He died on February 6, 2014, in Lund, Sweden at the age of 75.

Career
For 25 years, Ståhl was a member of Ragnar Söderberg Foundation, an organization dedicated to scientific researches. Ståhl has also worked as an Advisor to the Cabinet Office of the Government of Sweden and the Organisation for Economic Co-operation and Development (OECD). Since 1982, he was also a member of the Royal Swedish Academy of Engineering Sciences.

Nobel Prize

Ståhl was part of the Committee for the Prize in Economic Sciences in Memory of Alfred Nobel from 1969 until 1984. His committee duties included proposing laureates for the Prize.

References

Swedish economists
1938 births
2014 deaths
Academic staff of Lund University
Scientists from Stockholm
Stockholm University alumni
Members of the Royal Swedish Academy of Sciences